"A Case of Identity" is one of the 56 short Sherlock Holmes stories written by Sir Arthur Conan Doyle and is the third story in The Adventures of Sherlock Holmes. It first appeared in The Strand Magazine in September 1891.

Plot summary
The story revolves around the case of Miss Mary Sutherland, a woman with a substantial income from the interest on a fund set up for her. She is engaged to a quiet Londoner who has recently disappeared. Sherlock Holmes' detective powers are barely challenged as this turns out to be quite an elementary case for him, much as it puzzles Watson.

The fiancé, Hosmer Angel, is a peculiar character, rather quiet, and rather secretive about his life. Miss Sutherland only knows that he works in an office in Leadenhall Street, but nothing more specific than that. All his letters to her are typewritten, even the signature, and he insists that she write back to him through the local Post Office.

The climax of the sad liaison comes when Mr. Angel abandons Miss Sutherland at the altar on their wedding day.

Holmes, noting all these things, Hosmer Angel's description, and the fact that he only seems to meet with Miss Sutherland while her disapproving youngish stepfather, James Windibank, is out of the country on business, reaches a conclusion quite quickly. A typewritten letter confirms his belief beyond doubt. Only one person could have gained by this: Mr. James Windibank. Since the death of Mary Sutherland's mother  he's been the trustee of Mary's inheritage, and will continue to be able to finance his lifestyle, but only until she decides to leave home. Holmes deduces "Angel" had "disappeared" by simply going out the other side of a four-wheeler cab.

After solving the mystery, Holmes chooses not to tell his client the solution, since "If I tell her she will not believe me. You may remember the old Persian saying, 'There is danger for him who taketh the tiger cub, and danger also for whoso snatches a delusion from a woman.' There is as much sense in Hafiz as in Horace, and as much knowledge of the world." Holmes had earlier advised his client to forget "Mr. Angel", but Miss Sutherland refused to take Holmes' advice and vowed to remain faithful to "Angel" until he reappears – for at least ten years.

Holmes predicts Windibank will continue a career in crime and end up on the gallows.

Publication history
"A Case of Identity" was first published in the UK in The Strand Magazine in September 1891, and in the United States in the US edition of the Strand in October 1891. The story was published with seven illustrations by Sidney Paget in The Strand Magazine. It was included in the short story collection The Adventures of Sherlock Holmes, which was published in October 1892.

Adaptations

Film and television
This story was the basis for the third Holmes adventure (released in 1921) in the silent Stoll film series starring Eille Norwood.

In 2001, this was the basis for the last episode of the animated television series Sherlock Holmes in the 22nd Century.

In 2014, it is seen in "The Empty Hearse", from the BBC television series Sherlock, as one of the cases Sherlock works on with Molly Hooper assisting him. Mary Sutherland was portrayed by Elizabeth Coyle.  Molly Hooper was portrayed by Louise Brealey.

In the fourth episode of the 2014 Japanese puppetry television series Sherlock Holmes, Mary Sutherland is a pupil of Beeton School. She is in love with the senior Hosmer Angel who suddenly disappears in a cave at the back of the school. Holmes, a pupil who lives in room 221B of Baker Dormitory, suspects that Angel and Windibank, one of the childhood friends of Sutherland, are the same person and he and Watson find out that there is no pupil called Hosmer Angel in the school. Holmes appreciates Watson for consoling the broken-hearted Sutherland. Watson tells Holmes, who criticises novels as in the original story, that he is wrong to do so because various things can be learned from novels including how to understand the female mind.

Radio
Edith Meiser adapted the story as an episode of the radio series The Adventures of Sherlock Holmes, which aired on 5 May 1932, starring Richard Gordon as Sherlock Holmes and Leigh Lovell as Dr. Watson. Another episode adapted from the story aired on 21 April 1935 (with Louis Hector as Holmes and Lovell as Watson).

Edith Meiser also adapted the story for the radio series The New Adventures of Sherlock Holmes with Basil Rathbone as Holmes and Nigel Bruce as Watson. The episode aired on 30 November 1941. Another adaptation of the story aired in the same series on 30 May 1948 (with John Stanley as Holmes and Alfred Shirley as Watson).

John Gielgud played Sherlock Holmes and Ralph Richardson played Dr. Watson in a radio adaptation that aired on the BBC Light Programme on 2 November 1954. It was broadcast on NBC radio on 23 January 1955.

A radio adaptation aired in 1969, as part of the 1952–1969 BBC radio series starring Carleton Hobbs as Holmes and Norman Shelley as Watson. It was adapted by Michael Hardwick.

The story was adapted in 1990 by Peter Mackie as an episode of the 1989–1998 BBC radio series, starring Clive Merrison as Holmes and Michael Williams as Watson, and featuring Susannah Corbett as Mary Sutherland.

A 2014 episode of the radio series The Classic Adventures of Sherlock Holmes was adapted from the story, with John Patrick Lowrie as Holmes and Lawrence Albert as Watson.

Other media
Colin Dexter, known for writing the Inspector Morse novels, wrote a short story based on this called "A Case of Mis-Identity", in which Holmes's brother Mycroft is involved in the case's deduction; in this story, Holmes's theory about the 'Hosmer Angel' character is the same, while Mycroft deduces that 'Hosmer Angel' is a fiction created by the mother and daughter to eliminate the step-father, only for Watson to reveal that 'Hosmer Angel' is actually a real person who was attacked and robbed on the way to his wedding, hospitalized, and eventually treated by Watson, who used his own detective skills to verify the man's identity.

The story was adapted as the beginning of the third case in the 2016 Frogwares video game Sherlock Holmes: The Devil's Daughter. Watson is not present when Mary Sutherland arrives and Sherlock is accompanied by Orson Wilde, an American actor training to play him. The player can come up with different conclusions to the case and also make a choice concerning telling her the results of his deduction.

Keith  R. A. Decandido's short story, "Identity: An Adventure of Shirley Holmes and Jack Watson" updates the story to modern-day Manhattan. Here, the explanation is changed from nearsightedness to prosopagnosia, or face blindness.

Criticism

Feminist activist and literary reviewer Wanda Dexter strongly criticized Holmes' conduct:

References
Notes

Sources

External links

 

Sherlock Holmes short stories by Arthur Conan Doyle
Fiction set in 1887
1891 short stories
Works originally published in The Strand Magazine
Short stories adapted into films